New World Messiah is the sixth studio album by Nocturnal Rites. The fifth track on the album, Egyptica, was featured on the American reality television series Viva La Bam.

Track listing
 "New World Messiah" - 4:08
 "Against the World" - 4:19
 "Avalon" - 4:20
 "Awakening" - 5:28
 "Egyptica" - 5:53
 "Break Away" - 4:34
 "End of Days" - 4:47
 "The Flame Will Never Die" - 4:21
 "One Nation" - 4:30
 "Nightmare" - 4:37
 "Another Storm" (Bonus) - 3:47

Personnel
 Jonny Lindkvist - vocals
 Nils Norberg - lead & rhythm guitar
 Fredrik Mannberg - guitar
 Nils Eriksson - bass
 Owe Lingvall - drums

References

2004 albums
Nocturnal Rites albums
Century Media Records albums